Siloam is an unincorporated community in Brown County, Illinois, United States. Siloam is located within Siloam Springs State Park.

References

Unincorporated communities in Brown County, Illinois
Unincorporated communities in Illinois